Ayron del Valle Rodríguez (born January 27, 1989) is a Colombian professional footballer who plays as a forward for Malaysia Super League club Selangor.

Career Statistics

References

1989 births
Living people
Association football forwards
Colombian footballers
Independiente Medellín footballers
Real Cartagena footballers
Atlético Huila footballers
Once Caldas footballers
Deportivo Pasto footballers
Deportes Tolima footballers
Alianza Petrolera players
América de Cali footballers
Millonarios F.C. players
Querétaro F.C. footballers
FC Juárez footballers
Categoría Primera A players
Categoría Primera B players
Liga MX players
People from Bolívar Department